Richard Pengelley (born 21 August 1960) is an Australian former water polo player who competed and created  the 1984 Summer Olympics and in the 1988 Summer Olympics.

An Anglican Priest, Pengelley is the former Dean of Perth.

Pengelley is currently the chaplain of St Mary's Anglican Girls School

References

1950 births
Living people
Australian male water polo players
Olympic water polo players of Australia
Water polo players at the 1984 Summer Olympics
Water polo players at the 1988 Summer Olympics
21st-century Anglican priests
Deans of Perth
20th-century Australian people